Valdemaras Mačiulskis (born 19 July 1966) is a Lithuanian rower. He competed in the men's coxed pair event at the 1992 Summer Olympics.

References

1966 births
Living people
Lithuanian male rowers
Olympic rowers of Lithuania
Rowers at the 1992 Summer Olympics
Sportspeople from Vilnius